The third season of The Voice of Vietnam began on May 10, 2015, on VTV3. This season was hosted by Phan Anh and Linh Sunny, who served as the social media correspondence. The coaching panel of this season were Đàm Vĩnh Hưng, Mỹ Tâm, Thu Phương and Tuấn Hưng.

This was the last season to feature Đàm Vĩnh Hưng as coach, and Phan Anh as host, while also the only season to have Mỹ Tâm as coach.

In the final show aired on 20 September 2015, Nguyễn Đức Phúc from Mỹ Tâm's team was announced as the winner of this season.

Coaches and hosts
A lot of rumors arose when Cat Tien Sa announced that Giọng hát Việt- The Voice of Vietnam would return for its third season. In December 2014, it was speculated that Mỹ Tâm would become a coach in Thu Minh's previous position, especially when Thu Minh replaced Mỹ Tâm on the judging panel of Vietnam Idol for its sixth season. On March 6, 2015, a fanmade poster showing the coaches of the third season was leaked on the Internet, stating that the coaches would be Mỹ Tâm, Thu Phương, Tuấn Hưng and Bằng Kiều. However this poster was proved to be wrong by Cat Tien Sa, and Bằng Kiều announced that even though he did get an invitation to join the coaching panel, he turned the chance down. Upon seeing the fake poster, Tuấn Hưng himself confirmed that he would be a coach for The Voice. Even though he was in dark of who will sit with him on the coaching panel, he hoped that the fake poster is true. A week later, in a concert, Đàm Vĩnh Hưng, an original coach, confirmed that he would return to the show as a coach. On April 13, 2015, when the Blind Auditions were filmed, the coaching panel was officially confirmed: Đàm Vĩnh Hưng, Mỹ Tâm, Thu Phương and Tuấn Hưng. Mỹ Tâm was said to be paid 1,5 billion VND to join the show. Social think that the reason why Đàm Vĩnh Hưng decided to return to the show was because Mỹ Tâm was joining the show.

Phan Anh returned to the show for his third season as host, while Linh Sunny served as the backstage host and social media correspondence. The music director also changes, as musician Hồ Hoài Anh (coach on The Voice Kids) replaced Phương Uyên in the third season. Oppo Camera Phone replaced Nokia Lumia as the sponsor this season.

Teams
Color key

Blind auditions

Episode 1 (May 10)

Episode 2 (May 17)

Episode 3 (May 24)

Episode 4 (May 31)

Episode 5 (June 7)

The Battles
The battle rounds determine which contestant from each team is qualified for the Live Shows. Two (or three) contestants within a team are paired together to sing one song, but only one contestant is chosen for the live shows. Continuing with the format from season 2, each coach is allowed to "steal" two losing contestants from another coach's team. After the Battles, each team will have 7 artists for the lives. (This season didn't feature the Knockouts).

Color key:

1 Mỹ Tâm used both of her steals to save Lê Thái Sơn & Yến Tattoo, individually.

Live Shows

Liveshow 1 and 2: Top 28 (July 12 and 19) 
The remaining 28 artists competed on the first live round, in which team Thu Phương and Tuấn Hưng performed on the first night, while team Mỹ Tâm and team Đàm Vĩnh Hưng performed on the second night. Result was announced at the end of each liveshow. In each team, three top vote getters along with two saved by coach moved on to the next round, while the remaining two artists were eliminated.
Group performance: The Voice of Vietnam 3 Coaches (Medley of "Yêu dại khờ"/ "Dĩ vãng cuộc tình"/ "Chưa bao giờ"/ "Vậy là mình đã xa nhau" & "60 năm cuộc đời")
 Musical guests: Bùi Anh Tuấn ("Buông")

Liveshow 3 and 4: Top 20 (July 26 and August 9)

Liveshow 5 and 6: Top 16 (August 16 and 23)

Liveshow 7: Quarterfinals (August 30) 
In the quarterfinals, the act with the most public votes from the public was automatically sent through to the semifinals. Coaches then saved one act from their own team from elimination, while the other act was sent home.

Week 8: Semifinals (September 6)
The Semifinal worked exactly the way the previous seasons worked.
 Musical guests: Hoàng Thùy Linh ("Nhịp đập giấc mơ")

Week 9: Finals (September 13 and 20)
The Top 4 performed on September 13 to win the title, each finalist performed a cover song, an original song (or a song that describes them most) and a duet with their coach. The result was announced on the Gala show on September 20, when each contestant again performed a "song to win", then the voting window would be closed. The final show also featured performances from Taylor John Williams, a top 5 contestant of season 7 of The Voice .

Elimination chart
Color key
Artist's info

References

1
2015 Vietnamese television seasons